Lakhanpur may refer to:
Lucknow, formerly known as Lakhanpur
Lakhanpur, Jammu, India
Lakhanpur, Janakpur, Nepal
Lakhanpur, Mechi, Nepal
Lakhanpur, Narayani, Nepal
Lakhanpur, Budaun, Uttar Pradesh, India
Lakhanpur, Orissa, India